A trichodiscoma is a cutaneous condition, a benign, usually skin-colored tumor most often affecting the face and upper trunk.

See also 
 Birt–Hogg–Dubé syndrome
 Fibrofolliculoma
 List of cutaneous conditions
 List of cutaneous neoplasms associated with systemic syndromes

References

External links 

Epidermal nevi, neoplasms, and cysts